Galeommatidae is a family of small and very small saltwater clams, marine bivalve molluscs in the order Galeommatida.

Genera and species
Genera and species within the family Galeommatidae include:
 Achasmea Dall, Bartsch & Rehder, 1938
 Achasmea thaanumi Pilsbry, 1921
 Achasmea rugata Kuroda & Habe, 1971
 Aclistothyra McGinty, 1955
 Aclistothyra atlantica McGinty, 1955
Aenictomya Oliver & Chesney, 1997
Aenictomya mirabilis Lynge, 1909
Aenictomya quadrangularis Lynge, 1909
 Ambuscintilla Iredale, 1936
 Ambuscintilla daviei B. Morton, 2008
 Ambuscintilla praemium Iredale, 1936
 Austrodevonia Middelfart & Craig, 2004
 Austrodevonia percompressa Dall, 1899
 Austrodevonia sharnae Middelfart & Craig, 2004
 Axinodon Verrill & Bush, 1898
 Axinodon bornianus Dall, 1908
 Axinodon ellipticus Verrill & Bush, 1898
 Axinodon luzonicus E. A. Smith, 1885
 Axinodon moseleyi E. A. Smith, 1885
 Axinodon redondoensis T. Burch, 1941
 Axinodon symmetros Jeffreys, 1876
 Cymatioa Berry, 1964
Cymatioa cookae (Willett, 1937)
Cymatioa electilis (S. S. Berry, 1963) – wavy-edged kellyclam
 Chlamydoconcha Dall, 1884
 Chlamydoconcha orcutti Dall, 1884
 Divariscintilla Powell, 1932
 Divariscintilla cordiformis P. M. Mikkelsen and Bieler, 1992
 Divariscintilla luteocrinita P. M. Mikkelsen and Bieler, 1992
 Divariscintilla octotentaculata P. M. Mikkelsen and Bieler, 1992
 Divariscintilla troglodytes P. M. Mikkelsen and Bieler, 1989
 Divariscintilla yoyo P. M. Mikkelsen and Bieler, 1989
 Galeomma Turton, 1825
 Galeomma turtoni G. B. Sowerby, 1825
 Scintilla Deshayes, 1856
 Scintilla stevensoni Powell, 1932
 Scintillona Finlay, 1926
 Scintillona bellerophon O'Foighil and Gibson, 1984 - sea-cucumber clam
 Scintillona benthicola Dell, 1956
 Scintillona zelandica (Odhner, 1924)
 Vasconiella Dall, 1899
 Vasconiella maoria Powell, 1932
 Waldo Nicol, 1966
Waldo arthuri Valentich-Scott, Ó Foighil, & Li, 2013
Waldo digitatus Zelaya & Ituarte, 2013
Waldo parasiticus (Dall, 1876)
Waldo paucitentaculatus Zelaya & Ituarte, 2013
Waldo trapezialis Zelaya & Ituarte, 2002

References

 Powell A. W. B., New Zealand Mollusca, William Collins Publishers Ltd, Auckland, New Zealand 1979

External links

 
Bivalve families